Sobaeksan (Sobaek Mountain) is a mountain of the Sobaek Mountains, in South Korea. It lies between Danyang County in the province of Chungcheongbuk-do and the city of Yeongju in the province of Gyeongsangbuk-do.

The Korea Astronomy and Space Science Institute operates an observatory on this mountain.

See also
 Sobaeksan National Park
 List of mountains in Korea

Notes

References
 

Mountains of South Korea
Mountains of North Chungcheong Province
Mountains of North Gyeongsang Province
Sobaek Mountains